Jamaan Al-Dossari may refer to:

 Jamaan Al-Dossari (footballer, born 1987), Saudi football player
 Jamaan Al-Dossari (footballer, born 1993), Saudi football player